Nematopogon chalcophyllis is a moth of the family Adelidae or fairy longhorn moths. It was described by Edward Meyrick in 1935. It is only found in Zhejiang, China.

References

Adelidae
Moths of Asia
Insects of China
Endemic fauna of Zhejiang
Moths described in 1935
Taxa named by Edward Meyrick